The Powderhorn Park neighborhood of Minneapolis, Minnesota, United States (part of the larger Powderhorn community) is located approximately three miles south of downtown and is bordered by East Lake Street to the north, Cedar Avenue to the east, East 38th Street to the south, and Chicago Avenue to the west. Its namesake is the city's Powderhorn Park facility in the northwestern part of the neighborhood around Powderhorn Lake, which contains playing fields, playgrounds and a park building that hosts community education classes ranging from pottery to yoga. In winter, the Minneapolis Park and Recreation Board sets up a portable warming house and the lake is used for ice skating.

History 
Developed mainly between 1905 and 1920, it is a residential area consisting of single-family homes, duplexes, and three-story brick apartment buildings. Approximately 8,500 people live in Powderhorn Park. About 50% of the population is white and 13% are black. Hispanic or Latinos of any race are 27% of the population. Along Lake Street, there are numerous new and existing Hispanic and African businesses. Around 30% of residents speak a language other than English at home, and 20% are foreign-born residents. 

The neighborhood belongs Minneapolis City Council Ward 9, currently represented by Alondra Cano.

The park and lake are used as the setting for the last act in the city's annual May Day parade (actually occurring on the first Sunday in May), which is a play in motion that has been put on by the In the Heart of the Beast Puppet and Mask Theatre since 1975. As the parade runs south along Bloomington Avenue, participants wear a variety of costumes, and many manipulate giant puppets, all to produce a story that is based on sociopolitical themes including peace, environmentalism, current events, and others. After the parade story ends, the tail end of the parade is a "free speech" section which includes representatives of community groups and campaigning politicians. After the parade, there is an intermission as people gather on a hillside at the west end of the park for the Tree of Life ceremony.  Many details of the final act change from year to year, but there are several figures that consistently appear: River, Woods, Prairie, Sky, Sun, and the Tree of Life. At the end of the ceremony, a flotilla comes across the lake with the Sun figure in the central boat. The Sun awakens the Tree of Life (a figure which includes a traditional maypole), and the crowd sings "You Are My Sunshine" to mark the banishment of another season of winter.

In 2009, a group of residents started the Powderhorn365 program that documents the day-to-day life of the neighborhood, through a daily photograph from the neighborhood.

On May 25, 2020, the neighborhood was the site of the murder of George Floyd.  In response, residents of the neighborhood have vowed not to call the police, "doing so, they believed, would add to the pain that black residents of Minneapolis were feeling and could put them in danger." Protesters converted the 38th and Chicago intersection into George Floyd Square, an occupation protest and memorial site for George Floyd that persisted into 2021.

An encampment for people experiencing homelessness emerged at Powderhorn Park in mid 2020 as a result of civil disorder in the aftermath of George Floyd's murder. Some community members complained about the camp (which brought increased vehicle traffic, drugs, property damage, and at least two overdoses) and changed their behavior to avoid it, and others committed to not involving the police.  Some community members delivered meals, medical care, and counseling and sought support from the American Indian Movement to monitor the area. The Powderhorn Park encampment was considered the largest in the history of the Twin Cities metropolitan history, having 560 tents with an estimated 800 people living it by mid July 2020.

Notable residents
 Alison Bechdel, cartoonist
 Peter Gross, comic book artist and writer

See also 

 38th Street South
2020 Minneapolis park encampments

References

External links

Minneapolis Neighborhood Profile - Powderhorn Park
Powderhorn Park Neighborhood Association
Minnesota Stories: Powderhorn Park (broken link: archived version)
Minneapolis Park and Recreation Board: Powderhorn Park
Powderhorn365 Photography Project
Parks, Lakes, Trails and So Much More, a history of Minneapolis parks (pages 210-215)

Neighborhoods in Minneapolis